Żelkówko  (German: Klein Silkow) is a village in the administrative district of Gmina Kobylnica, within Słupsk County, Pomeranian Voivodeship, in northern Poland.

See also
History of Pomerania

References

Villages in Słupsk County